CGG triplet repeat-binding protein 1 is a protein that in humans is encoded by the CGGBP1 gene.

The existence of a CGG-binding factor was recognised in 1990 and the protein was identified by Deissler and colleagues in 1997. It has 167 amino acids and a mass of 20kDa and includes a C2H2 zinc finger DNA-binding domain. The human gene is on chromosome 3 at 3p11.1, right next to the centromere, where it has four known promoters. CGGBP1 appears to have evolved from hAT transposons and is found in all amniotes.

The protein binds to CGG trinucleotide repeats to regulate transcription (including inhibiting Alu elements) and translation. It is essential to cell survival, having wide cytoprotective functions including DNA repair and telomere maintenance. Because the gene's promoters include CGG repeats, it is self-regulatory.

CGGBP1 influences expression of the fragile X mental retardation gene, FMR1, by specifically interacting with the CGG trinucleotide repeat in its 5-prime UTR, the untranslated regulatory region upstream of the gene's coding sequence.

References

Further reading

External links